Maspotha Divisional Secretariat is a  Divisional Secretariat  of Kurunegala District, of North Western Province, Sri Lanka.

References
 Divisional Secretariats Portal

GS DIVISION MASPOTHA DS

792 - Gurulepola GS Division

Divisional Secretariats of Kurunegala District

795_ Dahigamuwa